
Gmina Pszczyna is an urban-rural gmina (administrative district) in Pszczyna County, Silesian Voivodeship, in southern Poland.

Villages
Apart from the town of Pszczyna, Gmina Pszczyna contains the villages and settlements of Brzeźce, Ćwiklice, Czarków, Jankowice, Łąka, Piasek, Poręba, Rudołtowice, Studzienice, Studzionka, Wisła Mała and Wisła Wielka.

Neighbouring gminas
Gmina Pszczyna is bordered by the gminas of Bestwina, Bojszowy, Czechowice-Dziedzice, Goczałkowice-Zdrój, Kobiór, Miedźna, Pawłowice, Strumień and Suszec.

Twin towns – sister cities

Gmina Pszczyna is twinned with:
 Bergisch Gladbach, Germany
 Holešov, Czech Republic
 Kaštela, Croatia
 Klein Rönnau, Germany

References

Pszczyna
Pszczyna County